Silverwood is a rural locality in the Southern Downs Region, Queensland, Australia.

Geography 

Connolly Dam is a reservoir in the centre of the locality. Originally known as Silverwood Dam, it was renamed Connolly Dam after Dan Connolly, who was Mayor of Warwick in 1910 and again from 1924 to 1932.

The Southern railway line enters the locality from the north (Morgan Park) and meanders south through the locality, passing through the Cherry Gully tunnel, before exiting to the south (Dalveen). The locality is served by Silverwood railway station.

History 
A railway camp was established to build the Big Tunnel (now known as the Cherry Gully Tunnel) on the Southern railway line.

Big Tunnel Camp School opened on 4 August 1879 as a private school for children of railway workers before a teacher was supplied by the Department of Public Instruction in 1879. Approximately 60 children attended the school. It closed in 1880.

Heritage listings 
Silverwood has a number of heritage sites, including:
 Cherry Gully Tunnel on the Southern railway line

References 

Southern Downs Region
Localities in Queensland